Pterolophia paravariolosa is a species of beetle in the family Cerambycidae. It was described by Austrian entomologist Stephan von Breuning in 1969.

References

paravariolosa
Beetles described in 1969